The 2003 Tro-Bro Léon was the 20th edition of the Tro-Bro Léon cycle race and was held on 1 June 2003. The race was won by Samuel Dumoulin.

General classification

References

2003
2003 in road cycling
2003 in French sport
June 2003 sports events in France